The Last Celt: A Bio–Bibliography of Robert Ervin Howard is a biography and bibliography of Robert E. Howard by Glenn Lord.  It was first published by Donald M. Grant, Publisher, Inc. in 1976 in an edition of 2,600 copies.

Contents
 Introduction, by E. Hoffmann Price
 Foreword, by Glenn Lord
 The Wandering Years
 An Autobiography
 A Touch of Trivia
 Letter: Robert E. Howard to Farnsworth Wright
 "On Reading and Writing", by Robert E. Howard
 Facts of Biography
 "A Biographical Sketch of Robert E. Howard", by Alvin Earl Perry
 "Robert Ervin Howard: A Memoriam", by H. P. Lovecraft
 "Lone Star Fictioneer", by Glenn Lord
 "A Memory of R.E. Howard", by E. Hoffmann Price
 "The Last Celt, by Howard Preece
 The Bibliography
 Books
 Fiction Verse
 Articles
 Letters
 Index by Periodicals
 Translations
 Unpublished Fiction with first lines
 Unpublished Verse
 Unpublished Articles
 Series Index
 Lost Manuscripts
 Unborn Books
 Comics
 Television Adaptation
 The Junto
 About the Author including 
 Books
 amateur publications 
 amateur press 
 articles 
 pastiches of Conan
 Miscellanea, including
 fragments
 photo album
 etc.

Reception
Richard A. Lupoff described The Last Celt as "a good general introduction and reference work on Howard."

References

1976 non-fiction books
American biographies
Books about Robert E. Howard
Biographies about writers
Science fiction studies
Donald M. Grant, Publisher books